Jesús Rubén Darío Salazar Gómez (born 22 September 1942) is a Colombian prelate of the Catholic Church who was Metropolitan Archbishop of Bogotá from 2010 to 2020. He was made a cardinal in 2012. He was Metropolitan Archbishop of Barranquilla from 1999 to 2010.

Early life and ministry
Jesús Rubén Darío Salazar Gómez was born in Bogotá, Colombia, in 1942. He completed his high school studies and philosophy at the seminary of Ibagué. At the Pontifical Gregorian University in Rome he followed the theological studies, obtaining a licentiate in dogmatic theology. He obtained his Licentiate in Sacred Scripture at the Pontifical Biblical Institute in Rome.

He was ordained a priest on 20 May 1967 and then held various positions including: pastor, seminary professor, director of the Department of Social Pastoral of the Colombian Episcopal Conference, and Vicar for Pastoral Care.

Bishop
He was named Bishop of Cúcuta on 11 February 1992 and was consecrated on 25 March. On 18 March 1999 he was appointed Archbishop of Barranquilla. He was appointed Archbishop of Bogotá on 8 July 2010. He took possession of the see on 13 August. During his installation, Salazar Gómez said that he would be focusing on three priorities: "protecting marriage as the union between one man and one woman, saving innocent life in the womb, and promoting peace in Colombia". Referring to the work of his predecessor, Cardinal Rubiano Sáenz, he said that "I will support each and every one of you with the affection of a father, a brother, a friend, because we have an arduous common task." He added that it is necessary "to discern together the will of the Lord for his people and to strengthen the conditions that will make possible a joint evangelizing endeavour."

Cardinal
He was created a cardinal by Pope Benedict XVI in a consistory on 24 November 2012. As cardinal priest he was assigned the titular church of San Gerardo Maiella.

On 31 January 2013, Pope Benedict XVI named him a member of the Pontifical Commission for Latin America and the Pontifical Council for Justice and Peace.

He participated as a cardinal elector in the 2013 papal conclave that elected Pope Francis.

Pope Francis appointed him a member of the Congregation for Bishops on 16 December 2013. In May 2015, he was elected to a four-year term as president of the Latin American Bishops Conference (CELAM).

On 25 April 2020, Pope Francis accepted his resignation as Archbishop of Bogota and appointed Luis José Rueda Aparicio to succeed him.

On 8 March 2022 Salazar was admitted to hospital suffering heart problems and after surgery to insert a stent he remained in intensive care.

References

External links

 
 

Living people
1942 births
21st-century Roman Catholic archbishops in Colombia
Pontifical Gregorian University alumni
Cardinals created by Pope Benedict XVI
Pontifical Biblical Institute alumni
Members of the Congregation for Bishops
Colombian cardinals
Roman Catholic archbishops of Bogotá
Roman Catholic archbishops of Barranquilla
Roman Catholic bishops of Cúcuta